The Gench-Ogluev House is a historic house in the  of Rostov-on-Don, Russia. The building has the status of an object of cultural heritage of federal significance.

History
In the late 1870s the important Rostov merchant  decided to build a revenue house. Architect Alexander Pomerantsev drew up the designs, with construction beginning in 1880 and being completed by 1883. It was Pomerantsev's first work in Rostov-on-Don.

Gench-Ogluev rented out the house. On the ground floor were business premises, and above them were offices and apartments. The Gench-Ogluev House was nationalized in the 1920s after the establishment of Soviet rule. Records from 1925 show that the ground floor of the house was at this time occupied by a branch of the South-Western Commercial corporate bank, the Rostov district office of "Neftesindikat", and the "Myasokombinat" butcher shop, as well as other premises. Living quarters occupied the second, third and fourth floors. In the 1930s, the "Ryba" fish shop was opened in the building.

The building sustained damage during the Great Patriotic War, with the destruction of the roof. The house was restored according to the design of architect G. O. Kalaydzhan between 1948 and 1949. The facade was refurbished with some changes. Brick dormer-windows were installed, and the tower was reduced in height and topped by a seahorse sculpture instead of a spire. Several damaged balconies were not restored.

Description 
The building was designed in the Beaux-Arts style. The architecture employs Baroque elements, with classical cornices, combined with Gothic bas-reliefs on the pediments. The facade is decorated with quoins.

References 

Tourist attractions in Rostov-on-Don
Buildings and structures in Rostov-on-Don
Cultural heritage monuments in Rostov-on-Don
Residential buildings completed in 1883
Beaux-Arts architecture in Russia
Cultural heritage monuments of federal significance in Rostov Oblast